Zamia chigua is a species of plant in the family Zamiaceae. It is found in Colombia (Choco Department and Valle del Cauca Department) and Panama (Chiriqui Province). Its natural habitat is subtropical or tropical moist lowland forests.

References

chigua
Near threatened plants
Plants described in 1854
Flora of Panama
Flora of Colombia
Taxonomy articles created by Polbot